Mikaela Banes is a fictional character from the Transformers universe. She is differentiated from "typical" women in her age group, having inherited mechanical skills from her father, Cal, a grease monkey and paroled car thief. The character is portrayed by Megan Fox in the first and second films and serves the role of Sam Witwicky's first love interest.

Character history

IDW Publishing
Mikaela was present shortly after the battle at Mission City in Transformers: Alliance #1 (December 2008) by IDW Publishing.

Films
In Transformers (2007), Mikaela is initially the girlfriend of football player Trent DeMarco. However, she soon ditches him because he treats her like a trophy wife. A smitten Sam offers her a ride home, and Mikaela accepts. She inspects Sam's broken-down 1976 Chevrolet Camaro (nicknamed Bumblebee) in an empty lovers lane and is astonished at the various modifications present in the engine bay. Unfortunately, the visuals of the actual engine under the hood show a discontinuity error on the part of the filmmakers: the shot shows that Bumblebee has a Kinsler crossram fuel injection intake manifold, as her character discusses a double-pumper carburetor. She also surprises Sam with her knowledge about cars which he finds more attractive than the popular shallow girl she acts like around others. When asked why she keeps her mechanical expertise a secret, she says, "guys don't like it when you know more about cars than they do." This scene is similar to Spike and Carly's first meeting in 1985, with Carly showing more interest in Bumblebee than in Spike. Mikaela happens to witness Bumblebee transforming. She then criticizes the poor conditions of Bumblebee's vehicle mode, causing him to scan a passing 2007 Camaro Concept and transform into the same model. She fights in the Battle of Mission City, initially pulling the seriously injured Bumblebee out of battle, but is ultimately unable to leave them to fight alone. She tells Bumblebee that if he's willing to fight, she will take him back in and navigate. He acquiesces and with her help, Bumblebee rejoins the battle and destroys Brawl. After the battle, she and Sam begin dating.

Mikaela returns in Revenge of the Fallen (2009), carrying on a long-distance relationship with Sam. As he goes off to college, Sam entrusts her with a fragment of the Allspark, which he found in the jacket he was wearing when he killed Megatron. Mikaela hides the fragment in a safe at her father's motorcycle repair shop, but she is followed by the Decepticon spy Wheelie, who is intent on recovering the fragment. She catches the spy and interrogates him. After going to inform Sam, Mikaela saves him from the Decepticon pretending to be a student named Alice (whom she kills and also found kissing Sam), only to be captured by Grindor and taken to the recently repaired Megatron. Rescued by Optimus Prime, Mikaela and everyone escape, and on the recommendation of Sam's roommate Leo, they seek help from a man who runs a robot conspiracy website. He is later revealed to be Agent Simmons. Simmons and Wheelie lead them to Jetfire, who uses a Space Bridge to transport the group to Egypt, where they search for object known as Matrix of Leadership. There Autobots and their allies battle the Decepticons and The Fallen. She is devastated when Sam apparently dies, but is ecstatic when he is revived and finally tells her he loves her. She survives the battle and returns home. Seen in the closing credits, Sam kisses Mikaela goodbye as he returns to college.

Mikaela does not appear in Dark of the Moon (2011) due to Fox being fired. Fox's departure was surrounded by controversy. Though it was mentioned that Sam and Mikaela broke up, Mikaela is never mentioned by name in Dark of the Moon and there was little explanation for why Mikaela and Sam ended their relationship. She apparently left Wheelie and Brains with Sam in Washington, and both retorted, saying she was "mean" and that they did not like her, which contradicts the previous film where Wheelie worshiped her as his "Warrior Goddess". However, in said movie Mikaela injured Wheelie's eye and threatened to take out his other eye, so he could still have that grudge. Despite this, a photo of Mikaela appears on Sam's dresser.

Depiction
When the breakdown for “Transformers” was sent to agents, the character, a high-school girl who discovers a race of robots and kind of saves the world, was described to Fox as a 16-year-old Angelina Jolie.

Fox's depiction was described by Inverse: "as love interest Mikaela Banes, she is an embodiment of the Cool Girl long before it became a bonafide thing".

Influence
Fox's performance propelled her to household name status. She was said to have palpable chemistry with her onscreen love interest. The character was noted for not being the "damsel in distress" type. According to Hindustan Times, the fact that she does not have to be saved added to the realism of Sam's character while at the same time enhancing Mikaela's own.

Books
In the novelization for Transformers: Dark of the Moon, Sam remembers being dumped by Mikaela, and fears the same will happen with his new girlfriend, Carly Spencer.

Video games
Mikaela made appearances in Transformers: The Game and Transformers: Revenge of the Fallen. In both games, she is a non-playable character. Rather, several "missions" in the game revolve around the Transformers reaching her and Sam to either save them or get their help.

Titan Magazines
Note: The information in italics occurs in the alternate storyline where Megatron won the battle for the Allspark.

Mikaela was a member of the Autobot resistance to the Decepticon takeover in Twilight's Last Gleaming, Part: 1 by Titan Magazines. She snuck into the Sector 7 page in an attempt to free the frozen Optimus Prime. In part 3, Bumblebee attempted to take on Megatron in the Sector 7 base as Mikaela attempted to free Optimus Prime, but she was attacked by Frenzy. In part 4, Mikaela frees Optimus Prime and freezes Frenzy just as Bumblebee gets some unexpected help fighting Megatron by the arrival of Elita One, Skyblast and Strongarm.

Toys
 Transformers Deluxe Longarm and Bumblebee Screen Battle: Final Stand (2007)
Deluxe Longarm comes packaged in this mini-diorama with a legless version of Robot Replicas Bumblebee. Unlike the regular packaged version, this version of Longarm is decorated with "Mike's Towing" labels as seen on the film instead of "Orson's Towing". It also has a little driver figure of Mikaela inside.

 ''Transformers Deluxe Barricade with Frenzy Screen Battles: First Encounter (2007)
A gift set packaged as a mini-diorama with Deluxe Barricade and figurines of Sam and Mikaela, along with an extra, non-poseable Frenzy figure.

 Revenge of the Fallen Human Alliance Autobot Skids with Arcee and Mikaela Banes (2009)
A 2-inch action figure of Mikaela comes with Human Alliance Skids and a small, transformable Arcee figure.

 Transformers'' Human Alliance Shadow Blade Sideswipe with Mikaela Banes (2010)
A black/silver redeco of Human Alliance Sideswipe with a figure of Mikaela that wears a black leather jacket and blue jeans.

References

Fictional mechanics
Female characters in film
Teenage characters in film
Transformers characters